Taicheng (台城) could refer to two township-level divisions of the PRC:

Taicheng Subdistrict (台城街道), seat of Taishan City, Guangdong
Taicheng, Wutai County (台城鎮), town in Wutai County, Shanxi

Taicheng (台城) was the palace of Eastern Wu, Eastern Jin Dynasty and Southern Dynasties during 331 AD ~ 589 AD in Nanjing.